Legacy of the Catacombs is a compilation album by the technical death metal band Nile. It was released on July 10, 2007. It was called "a collection of band and fan favorites, as well as a bonus DVD containing all of their studio videos".

Track listing
"Cast Down the Heretic" 
"Sacrifice Unto Sebek" 
"Lashed to the Slave Stick" 
"Execration Text" 
"Sarcophagus" 
"Unas Slayer of the Gods" 
"Masturbating the War God"  
"Chapter for Transforming into a Snake" 
"Black Seeds of Vengeance" 
"The Howling of the Jinn" 
"Barra Edinazzu" 
"Smashing the Antiu"

References 

Nile (band) albums
2007 compilation albums
2007 video albums
Music video compilation albums